Ehrenfried Patzel (Czech: Čestmír Patzel) (born 2 December 1914; died 8 March 2004 in Büdingen) was an Ethnic German football player from Czechoslovakia.

Patzel played for Teplitzer FK from 1932 to 1939, then he went to Germany to play for 1. SV Jena from 1939 to 1942 and for Offenbacher Kickers from 1942 to 1948.

He also played four matches for the Czechoslovakian national team and was a participant at the 1934 FIFA World Cup.

References 
  ČMFS entry
 Lubomír Král: Historie německé kopané v Čechách. Prague 2006. p. 138. pdf

1914 births
2004 deaths
People from Chabařovice
Sudeten German people
German footballers
Czechoslovak footballers
1934 FIFA World Cup players
Association football goalkeepers
Kickers Offenbach players
Czechoslovakia international footballers
Czechoslovak expatriate footballers
Expatriate footballers in Germany
Sportspeople from the Ústí nad Labem Region